The 2017 Big South men's basketball tournament was the conference tournament for the Big South Conference. It was played between February 28, 2017 and March 5, 2017 at various campus sites. Winthrop defeated Campbell, 76–59, to win the tournament championship and receive the conference's automatic bid to the NCAA tournament.

Sites 
The first round was played at campus sites at the home of the higher seed. The quarterfinals and semifinals were played at No. 1-seeded Winthrop's Winthrop Coliseum in Rock Hill, South Carolina. The championship game was held at the home of the highest remaining seed, Winthrop's Winthrop Coliseum.

Seeds
All 10 conference teams were eligible for the tournament. The top six teams receive a first round bye. Teams were seeded by record within the conference, with a tiebreaker system to seed teams with identical conference records.

Schedule

Bracket

References

External links
2017 Big South Men's Basketball Championship

Tournament
Big South Conference men's basketball tournament
Big South Conference men's basketball tournament
Big South Conference men's basketball tournament
Big South Conference men's basketball tournament